Matagalls is one of the highest mountains of the Montseny Massif, Catalonia, Spain. It has an elevation of 1,697.9 metres above sea level.

See also
Catalan Pre-Coastal Range
Mountains of Catalonia

References

External links
Catalan Excursion Center

Mountains of Catalonia
One-thousanders of Spain
Emblematic summits of Catalonia